Ricky Ortiz (born April 15, 1994) is an American football fullback who is a free agent. He played college football at Oregon State.

Early years
Ortiz attended and played high school football at Mater Dei High School.

College career
Ortiz committed to Oregon State in 2013, as a fullback. Ortiz started his first career game as a fullback as a sophomore in 2014, where he had no rush attempts, but 12 catches for 90 yards and no touchdowns. Ortiz switched to tight end during the 2015 season, as well as briefly to linebacker. His linebacker stint did not last long, but he did make some starts at tight end during 2015 and 2016. In 2015, he had no receptions (because he was primarily used as a blocker), but in 2016, he had 5 receptions for 34 yards, scoring his only college touchdown. He was also a core special teams player, racking up 47 tackles in his collegiate career, the 2nd most special teams tackles on the Beavers. He split time from halfback, tight end, fullback, and linebacker.

Professional career

Baltimore Ravens
Ortiz signed with the Baltimore Ravens on April 29, 2017 as an undrafted free agent. He was waived by the Ravens on September 2, 2017 and was signed to the practice squad the next day. He was released on October 3, 2017, but was re-signed on November 14, 2017. He signed a future/reserve contract on January 2, 2018. He was released by the Ravens on May 7, 2018.

Atlanta Falcons
Ortiz signed with the Atlanta Falcons on May 23, 2018. He made his NFL debut in the season opener against the Philadelphia Eagles. He was the starting fullback in the 18–12 loss. On September 2, 2019, the Falcons waived Ortiz with an injury settlement.

New Orleans Saints
On November 22, 2019, Ortiz was signed to the New Orleans Saints practice squad. He was released on December 4, 2019. He was re-signed to the active roster on December 28, 2019. He was waived on August 2, 2020.

Trivia
Outside of football, Ortiz's heart yearns to become an avocado farmer.

References

External links
Atlanta Falcons bio
Oregon State Beavers bio

1994 births
Living people
American football fullbacks
Atlanta Falcons players
Baltimore Ravens players
New Orleans Saints players
Oregon State Beavers football players
People from Moreno Valley, California
Players of American football from California
Sportspeople from Riverside County, California